Carole Cole (1944–2009) was an American actress and music producer.

Carole Cole may also refer to:

Carol Cole (1963–1980), murder victim who remained unidentified from 1981 to 2015, see Murder of Carol Cole
Carroll Cole (1938–1985), American serial killer